Eucalyptus aridimontana is a mallee that is endemic to a small area in the Pilbara region of Western Australia. It has smooth bark, lance-shaped adult leaves, flower buds in groups of seven or nine, white flowers and barrel-shaped fruit.

Description
The bark is grey and cream-coloured and smooth over the length of the tree.

Taxonomy and naming
Eucalyptus aridimontana was first formally described in 2012 by Dean Nicolle and Malcolm E. French from a specimen collected near Tom Price. The description was published in the journal Nuytsia. The specific epithet (aridimontana) is derived from  Latin words meaning "dry" and "montane", referring to the habitat of this species.

Distribution and habitat
This mallee grows in skeletal soils on the slopes, ridges and summits of high mountains in the Hamersley Range of the Gascoyne and Pilbara biogeographic regions.

Conservation
Eucalyptus aridimontana is classified as "not threatened" by the Western Australian Government Department of Parks and Wildlife.

See also
List of Eucalyptus species

References

aridimontana
Endemic flora of Western Australia
Myrtales of Australia
Eucalypts of Western Australia
Plants described in 2012